The Swiss Ice Hockey Federation (SIHF) is the governing body of ice hockey in Switzerland, as recognized by the International Ice Hockey Federation (IIHF). It was founded in 1908 and is a founding member of the IIHF. It manages both the amateur and professional games in Switzerland, as well as the national teams on junior and senior levels.

See also
 Ice Hockey World Championships
 Switzerland men's national ice hockey team
 Switzerland women's national ice hockey team
 National League, top tier men's league
 Swiss League, second tier men's league
 Regio League (Swiss 1. liga)
 Women's League (SWHL A)

References

External links
IIHF profile
Swiss Ice Hockey Federation - official website 
Swiss Ice Hockey Federation - official website 

Ice hockey in Switzerland
International Ice Hockey Federation members
Switzerland
Ice Hockey
Sports organizations established in 1908
1908 establishments in Switzerland